Beryl Hallam Augustine Tennyson (10 December 1920 – 21 December 2005) was a British radio producer.

Hallam Tennyson was born in Chelsea, the third son of Sir Charles Tennyson and his wife Ivy (née Pretious), and a great-grandson of the Poet Laureate Alfred, Lord Tennyson.  

Tennyson was educated at Eton College and Oxford University.

He married Margot Wallach in Kensington, London, in 1946. She was born on 30 March 1921 in Mönchengladbach, Germany, and died on 19 April 1999 in Highgate, London. The couple had a son, Jonathan Tennyson (born 1955), and a daughter.

He joined the BBC World Service in 1956, working as a radio producer and becoming assistant head of drama.
His own radio play The Spring of the Beast, an account of the friendship between Henry James and author Constance Fenimore Woolson, was broadcast on BBC Radio 4 as The Monday Play  on 26 May and repeated as Afternoon Theatre on 31 May 1986. James is depicted as unable to overcome his inhibitions against loving either a woman or another man.

Tennyson nursed his wife through her regular spells of mental illness. During the 1970s he began to campaign for gay rights, and around that time revealed his homosexuality, writing in 1984 an autobiography, The Haunted Mind, which was serialised in a newspaper.

He was stabbed to death in his bed, at home in Highgate, in December 2005. His murder remains unsolved.

References

1920 births
2005 deaths
2005 in London
People from Chelsea, London
English murder victims
Unsolved murders in London
People murdered in London
British radio producers
People educated at Eton College
Alumni of the University of Oxford
Deaths by stabbing in London
Hallam
English LGBT people
2005 murders in the United Kingdom
20th-century LGBT people